Andrea Jaeger and Mary-Lou Piatek won in the final 7–5, 6–4 against Rosemary Casals and Wendy Turnbull.

Seeds
Champion seeds are indicated in bold text while text in italics indicates the round in which those seeds were eliminated.

Draw

Final

Top half

Bottom half

External links
 1983 Avon Cup Doubles Draw

Doubles